

Archosauromorphs

Newly named protorosaurs

Newly named dinosaurs
Data courtesy of George Olshevsky's dinosaur genera list.

References

1940s in paleontology
Paleontology
Paleontology 5